Koseze is a settlement on the left bank of the Reka River southwest of Ilirska Bistrica in the Inner Carniola region of Slovenia.

History
During the short ten-day Slovene Independence War in 1991, Yugoslav and Slovene troops met in a small engagement ending with a handful of casualties in the village of Koseze.

Church
The small church in the settlement is dedicated to Mary Magdalene and belongs to the Parish of Ilirska Bistrica.

References

External links
Koseze on Geopedia

Populated places in the Municipality of Ilirska Bistrica